Anderson Township is one of fifteen townships in Clark County, Illinois, USA.  As of the 2020 census, its population was 460 and it contained 183 housing units.

Geography

Unincorporated towns
 Allright
 Choctaw
(This list is based on USGS data and may include former settlements.)

Cemeteries
The township contains these five cemeteries: Blizzard, Fox, Norton, Shott and Ziegler.

Major highways
  Illinois Route 1

Landmarks
 Lincoln Trail State Park (south three-quarters)

Demographics
As of the 2020 census there were 460 people, 179 households, and 166 families residing in the township. The racial makeup of the township was 95.65% White, 0.00% African American, 0.87% Native American, 0.87% Asian, 0.00% Pacific Islander, 0.65% from other races, and 1.96% from two or more races. Hispanic or Latino of any race were 0.87% of the population.

There were 179 households, out of which 12.80% had children under the age of 18 living with them, 89.39% were married couples living together, 3.35% had a female householder with no spouse present, and 7.26% were non-families. 7.30% of all households were made up of individuals, and none had someone living alone who was 65 years of age or older. The average household size was 2.31 and the average family size was 2.42.

The township's age distribution consisted of 11.8% under the age of 18, 15.2% from 18 to 24, 19.8% from 25 to 44, 49.1% from 45 to 64, and 4.1% who were 65 years of age or older. The median age was 52.8 years. For every 100 females, there were 122.6 males. For every 100 females age 18 and over, there were 101.7 males.

The median income for a household in the township was $77,708, and the median income for a family was $78,095. Males had a median income of $50,607 versus $42,520 for females. The per capita income for the township was $38,788. None of population was below the poverty line.

School districts
 Marshall Community Unit School District #C-2
 Martinsville Community Unit School District #C-3

Political districts
 Illinois' 15th congressional district
 State House District 109
 State Senate District 55

References
 
 United States Census Bureau 2007 TIGER/Line Shapefiles
 United States National Atlas

External links
 City-Data.com
 Illinois State Archives

Townships in Clark County, Illinois
Townships in Illinois